Rolando Locatelli (born 22 October 1949) is an Argentine rower. He competed in the men's coxed four event at the 1968 Summer Olympics.

References

1949 births
Living people
Argentine male rowers
Olympic rowers of Argentina
Rowers at the 1968 Summer Olympics
Sportspeople from Rosario, Santa Fe
Pan American Games medalists in rowing
Pan American Games silver medalists for Argentina
Rowers at the 1967 Pan American Games